Events in the year 1435 in Japan.

Incumbents
Monarch: Go-Hanazono

Births
January 20 - Ashikaga Yoshimasa (d. 1490), shōgun
Yoshida Kanetomo (d. 1511) - Shinto priest

References 

 
 
Japan
Years of the 15th century in Japan